, known professionally as , is an Okinawan hip hop artist. She made her major label debut with Universal Music Japan in 2020. Her stage name is short for "Asian wish child," which is the literal meaning of the Japanese characters in her given name.

Early life and education
Awich was born in Naha, Okinawa on December 16, 1986. Because Okinawa is home to many U.S. military bases, Awich was exposed to American culture at an early age. As a young girl, she idolized Tupac and credits Tupac songs with helping her learn English. She wrote her first lyrics at age 13, and gave her first public hip hop performance at age 14. At age 19, she moved to Atlanta, Georgia, where she met and married an American husband and gave birth to a daughter. She also earned a bachelor's degree in business and marketing from the University of Indianapolis in 2011. However, her husband was incarcerated and later was murdered after his release from prison, at which point Awich returned to Japan with her daughter.

Career
Awich made her musical debut in Japan prior to her move to the United States. In 2006, she independently released an album titled Asian Wish Child.

Following her return to Japan from the United States, Awich initially focused on building up her self-founded branding company Cypher City, which works to market Okinawan products overseas. However, she soon returned to the world of hip hop music.

In 2017, Awich joined the Japanese hip hop collective Yentown as its only female member, and began building her mainstream career. With the label, she released two studio albums, 8 and Peacock, as well as two extended plays, Beat and Heart. In 2020, Awich signed with Universal Music Japan sublabel Universal J. Her first release under the label was Partition, her fifth extended play. Two promotional singles, "Shook Shook" and "Bad Bad" were released from the EP. Later that year, she released a cover of "Happy Xmas (War Is Over)" and an original song titled "Present". In 2021, Awich released two singles, "Gila Gila" and "Kuchi ni Dashite". Her 2007 debut album was re-released digitally by LD&K Inc in September. In March 2022, her major label debut album, Queendom was released. In May, Awich released the single "Tsubasa" to celebrate the 50th anniversary of Okinawa's return to Japanese sovereignty in 1971. The song features vocals from her daughter, Yomi.

Awich headlined at Budokan in 2022 after the release of her fourth studio album. With five studio albums (produced primarily by music producer Chaki Zulu), Awich appeared at Japan's only outdoor rock music festival Fuji Rock in 2022, often compared to Coachella in the U.S. Her aim has been to become the "Queen of Japanese hiphop":Before I knew I had the potential to be big and famous, but I didn’t have the guts to be at the center of everything. Now, I’m aiming to be the queen of Japan. Period. With that comes responsibility. It’s about owning your own words and not being afraid to be bashed for them.With a body of work often viewed as "the epitome of female empowerment" in Japanese hip-hop, she is also part of a field of Asian women in rap.

Discography

Studio albums

Extended plays

Singles

As a collaborating artist

Promotional singles

Notes

References

Japanese women hip hop musicians
Musicians from Okinawa Prefecture
1986 births
Living people
People from Naha
University of Indianapolis alumni